Bobi Celeski (born 10 June 1997) is a Macedonian footballer who plays as a goalkeeper for North Macedonian club Vardar. His father was also a professional footballer and goalkeeper, playing for clubs in North Macedonia, Turkey and Hungary, as well as the Macedonian national team between 1994 and 1997.

Career

KF Teuta
Celeski joined the club in August 2018, being utilized mostly as a backup goalkeeper throughout his first two seasons with the club. He made his competitive debut for the club on 12 September 2018, in a 3-0 victory in the Albanian Cup over KF Turbina. Celeski made his Albanian Superliga debut on 27 January 2019 in a 1-1 home draw with Flamurtari. During his time with the team, they won the Albanian Championship, the Albanian Cup and the Albanian Supercup.

FK Vardar
In August 2022 he joined Vardar.

References

External links
Bobi Celeski at SofaScore

1997 births
Living people
FK Makedonija Gjorče Petrov players
KF Teuta Durrës players
Macedonian First Football League players
Kategoria Superiore players
Macedonian footballers
North Macedonia youth international footballers
Association football goalkeepers
Macedonian expatriate footballers